The Red Line is a rapid transit line in Chicago, run by the Chicago Transit Authority (CTA) as part of the Chicago "L" system. It is the busiest line on the "L" system, with an average of 73,273 passengers boarding each weekday in 2021. It runs elevated from the Howard station in the Rogers Park neighborhood on the North Side, through a subway on the Near North Side, Downtown, and the South Loop, and then through the Dan Ryan Expressway median to 95th Street/Dan Ryan in the Lilydale neighborhood on the South Side. 

Like Chicago's Blue Line, the Red Line runs 24 hours a day, 365 days a year, making Chicago, New York City, and Copenhagen the only three cities in the world that operate train service 24 hours a day throughout their city limits. 

The City of Chicago is planning an extension of the Red Line, adding 5.6 miles and four new stations, that would extend the Red Line from 95th Street to 130th Street. In December 2022, the Chicago City Council approved the creation of a district that will send nearly $1 billion in tax revenue over the next few decades to extend the Red Line south of 95th Street, a major step toward completing the project after a half-century of false starts.

Route

North Side Main Line

The northern terminus of the Red Line is Howard in the Rogers Park neighborhood of Chicago, on the north side. The Red Line extends southeasterly on an elevated embankment structure about a half-mile (1 kilometer) west of the lakefront to Touhy Avenue then turns south along Glenwood Avenue to Morse station. 

From there the route swings on a sweeping reverse curve to the east to Sheridan Road, adjacent to Loyola University Chicago and continues southerly parallel to Broadway to the east (in Edgewater) and follows Broadway to Leland Avenue. From here, the route transitions from concrete embankment to steel elevated structure. The "L" continues southward running adjacent the Graceland Cemetery, Irving Park Road and Sheffield Avenue from Uptown to Lincoln Park. The Brown Line (Ravenswood) joins the Red Line tracks just north of Belmont.

South of Belmont, Red, Brown and Purple Line Express trains run side-by-side on the four track North Side "L" to Armitage. Red Line trains run on the two middle tracks, only making two stops at Belmont & Fullerton and skipping Wellington, Diversey and Armitage.

Wrigley Field, home of the Chicago Cubs, is served by the Addison station. Additionally, Guaranteed Rate Field, home of the Chicago White Sox, is served by the Sox–35th station.

The North Side Main Line of the Red Line travels from Howard station to Armitage station.

State Street subway

After running through Armitage, the Red Line descends to a portal at Willow Street and enters the subway, turning southeast on Clybourn Avenue, east at Division Street, and south at State Street through the Loop to Roosevelt Road. South of Roosevelt Road, there is a junction, with one pair of tracks curving to the east and leaving the subway at 13th Street and connecting to the old South Side "L" at 18th and State Streets. This section was used from October 1943, until February 1993, when trains from Howard were routed to the Englewood and Jackson Park branches, today the south branches of the Green Line. 

The 13th Street portal is now used for non-service train moves and emergency purposes. The 13th Street portal was used again for regular "L" service from May 2013, until October 2013, because Red Line trains were rerouted to the Green Line's South Side Main Line tracks and terminated at Ashland/63rd during the five months of the Red Line South Reconstruction Project. This service was used again from April 2017 to November 2017 and July 2018 to April 2019.

Unique to the Red Line, it is the only Chicago "L" line that connects to all seven other "L" lines full-time. The Purple Line shares the distinction only when it runs its weekday rush hour route.

Dan Ryan branch

At 13th Street, the subway swings away from State Street on a reverse curve to the southwest then rises to another portal at 16th Street adjacent Metra's Rock Island District line. The Red Line leaves at 16th Street and continues southward on an elevated structure to 24th Street. There is a stop at Cermak–Chinatown on this portion.

South of Cermak Road, the Red Line tracks enter the median strip of the Franklin Street Connector, The Red Line then tunnels beneath the expressway interchange between 28th and 30th Streets and continues the rest of the way to 95th Street in the median of the Dan Ryan Expressway (Interstate 90 & 94). Chicago pioneered using expressway medians for local "L" train lines (the other two being the Eisenhower Expressway and Kennedy Expressways, which both carry portions of the Blue Line). The Red Line follows the Dan Ryan the rest of the way to the 95th Street terminal in Roseland. 

The 98th Yard lies just south and east of the Dan Ryan–Bishop Ford Expressway interchange. Beyond the interchange, the Dan Ryan and Bishop Ford expressways continue towards the city's limits south without a transit line in the median strip, but with a wide grass median where future extensions of the rapid transit line is an option. An extension to 130th Street is in its final planning stages. This extension includes three elevated stations at 103rd, 111th, and Michigan, an at-grade terminal station at 130th.

Stations along the Red Line serve important Chicago landmarks such as Guaranteed Rate Field and the Illinois Institute of Technology (Sox–35th), DePaul University (Fullerton), the Auditorium Building of Roosevelt University and Loyola University Chicago (Loyola), as well as the Magnificent Mile and Chinatown.

In May 2013, the branch, along with all nine stations, closed for five months to allow the replacement of the tracks and for construction crews to improve the stations on the branch. The newly reconstructed Dan Ryan branch and the nine stations reopened in October 2013.

Rolling stock
The Red Line is operated with the Bombardier-built 5000-series railcars. From 2012 until October 2013, the Red Line was operated with the 2400-series cars, during weekday rush hours, and from 1993 until 2015, the Red Line was operated with the 2600-series cars. As the 5000-series cars were delivered, the Red Line's 2600-series cars were transferred to other lines to replace the 2400-series cars. From October 2013 until April 2014, several of the Red Line's 2600-series cars were transferred over to the Purple Line as they were displaced on the Red Line by the 5000-series cars. 

Beginning in June 2014, CTA began to transfer the 2600-series cars from the Red Line over to the Blue Line due to them being newer than the existing Blue Line cars. The Blue Line's older 2600-series cars were transferred to the Orange Line as an interim replacement for its 2400-series cars. Beginning in October 2014, CTA started transferring some of the Red Line's 2600-series cars to the Orange Line, replacing the Orange Line's remaining 2400-series cars until the Red Line was fully equipped with the 5000-series cars.

Operating hours and headways
Like the Blue Line, the Red Line runs 24 hours a day. All trains run between Howard and 95th/Dan Ryan stations. On weekdays, service runs very frequently at 30tph (trains per hour) during rush hour, and 8tph during the midday and nighttime. On Saturdays 6tph in the early morning, then increase to 10–11 tph during the day, then 8tph at night. On Sundays, service runs 6tph early morning, then increase to 8tph minutes all day into early evening, 6tph later at night. Between approximately midnight and 5:30 a.m., night owl service on the Red Line ranges between ten and fifteen minutes (4–6 tph).

History

The oldest section of the line opened on May 31, 1900, running from the Loop to Wilson. It was constructed by the Northwestern Elevated Railroad. The route was extended to Central Street in Evanston on May 16, 1908, via leased and electrified trackage belonging to the Chicago, Milwaukee and St. Paul Railway. In November 1913, the North Side "L" was through routed with the South Side "L" lines through the Loop. The ground-level section between Leland Avenue and Howard Street was elevated on a concrete embankment structure and widened to four tracks in 1922.

The State Street subway opened on October 17, 1943, providing two new tracks bypassing the Loop tracks and the portion of the North and South Side "L" lines not equipped with express tracks. By providing an express route free of the most restrictive curves on the Chicago "L" and shorter than the old line it supplemented, the subway reduced running time by as much as eleven minutes for a one-way trip. The route was placed in operation on October 17, 1943, for a portion of the through north–south trains, although other trains continued to use the "L" both on through trips and on services circling the Loop and returning to the point of origin.

In August 1949, the North–South route was revised to create a more efficient routing through the Central Business District and handle the heavy volumes of passenger traffic using it. The Howard branch was paired with the Englewood and Jackson Park branches through the State Street subway, using the 13th Street portal and the other lines routed to the Loop "L".

The Dan Ryan Branch opened in September 1969, and was paired with the Lake Street branch to form the West-South route, almost universally referred to as the Lake–Dan Ryan route. It operated over the Lake Street and Wabash Avenue sides of the Union Loop. This "interim" service was created mainly for the purpose of providing through service between the west side and the south side in anticipation of the 1968 Loop Subway Project. When the controversial subway project was cancelled in 1979, the Lake-Dan Ryan service remained and lasted for 24 years.

For much of the 20th century, the Howard–Englewood/Jackson Park route was equally compatible in terms of passenger service until the late 1960s through the 1970s. However, passenger traffic volumes began to shift on the south side lines, with more riders using the newer Dan Ryan line (which runs four miles (6 km) further south) and fewer riders on the older "L" lines. This level of ridership allowed the CTA to develop a more efficient system by combining the more heavily used rail lines together and combining the other lines together, providing increased service capacity for the routes that need it. The Red Line was created in 1993, when the CTA adopted color-coded system for all of its "L" routes. 

In February 1993, a new connection opened from the State Street subway south of Roosevelt to Cermak–Chinatown. The Howard branch was paired with the Dan Ryan branch creating the current Red Line and the Lake Street branch was paired with the Englewood and Jackson Park branches to form the Green Line. A further operational benefit of this switch was that this freed up capacity in the Loop needed for the addition of the Orange Line to Midway Airport. The former tracks used to move West-South trains from the Loop to the Dan Ryan line are still retained for non-revenue moves and service disruptions.

The Dan Ryan Branch of the Red Line underwent a rehabilitation period to improve its aging infrastructure which ended in early 2007. This work included upgrading the power and signal systems, and rehabilitating the stations with improved lighting, a cleaner appearance, and new escalators and elevators. The CTA has plans to expand Red Line service to ten car trains from the current eight-car trains.

Red Ahead and proposed extension

In spring 2012, the CTA started a station and track rehabilitation program dubbed "Red Ahead", beginning on the North Side Main Line, which is called the "Red North" project. The program monitors the full route of the Red Line, excluding the Loyola, Bryn Mawr, Sheridan, or Wilson station. This also doesn't include stations between Wilson through Fullerton, nor the State Street subway. In May 2012, the CTA started to work on the North Side Main Line stations of the Red Line which includes Jarvis, Morse, Granville, Thorndale, Berwyn, Argyle and Lawrence. The stations are listed in order, starting at Granville, then Morse, Thorndale, Argyle, Berwyn, Lawrence and finally Jarvis. This project started in June 2012 and was completed in December 2012. This project is also part of the Red Ahead's "Red & Purple Modernization" Project.

The Red & Purple Modernization Project will include a redesign of a diamond junction north of Belmont Station into a flyover for Brown Line trains. This project will decrease train backups and increase the number of trains that can cross the junction per hour. The project was criticized by 2015 mayoral candidate Chuy García and local residents in the Lakeview neighborhood who organized a referendum to stop it. The Federal Transit Administration passed the CTA's environmental review on the flyover in January 2016 and received a $1.1 billion federal grant the following year. 16 properties affected by the flyover were demolished. Construction began on October 2, 2019 and the flyover entered service on November 19, 2021.

, proposals have been underway to extend the Red Line south from 95th Street. The CTA developed nine different proposed routes, one of which includes routing the Red Line down the median of the Bishop Ford Freeway and another in the median of Interstate 57. During an alternatives analysis meeting on April 11, 2007, CTA narrowed further study down to five possible routes, two for bus rapid transit and three for heavy rail (rapid) transit. The two bus routes would travel south from the 95th/Dan Ryan terminal either down Halsted Street or Michigan Avenue, while the heavy rail routes left for consideration were the Halsted and Michigan corridors (either underground or elevated) as well as the Union Pacific Railroad corridor (elevated or trench), which would traverse southeastward toward the South Shore Line. In October 2008, the CTA commissioned a $150,000 study of an extension due south to 130th/Stony Island in the community area of Riverdale.

In December 2008, at the Screen 2 presentation of the federally mandated Alternatives Analysis Study, the possible corridors and modes of transit were furthered narrowed down to either Halsted Street (bus rapid transit or elevated Heavy Rail Transit) and the Union Pacific Railroad corridor (elevated Heavy Rail Transit).

In December 2009, the CTA identified the locally preferred alternative as the Union Pacific corridor. A map and description of the route are found at TransitChicago.com. Multiple Environmental Impact Studies will be carried out, and will determine exact alignments and design.

The alignment consists of a new elevated rail line between 95th/Dan Ryan and a new terminal station at 130th Street, paralleling the Union Pacific Railroad and the South Shore Line through the Far South Side neighborhoods of Roseland, Washington Heights, West Pullman and Riverdale. In addition to the terminal station at 130th, three new stations would be built at 103rd, 111th, and Michigan, and a new yard and shop would be built at 120th street. Basic engineering, along with an environmental impact statement, are currently underway.

Station listing

Rail yards
There are two rail yards for the Red Line cars: Howard Yard, for the northern portion of the line and the 98th Yard for the southern portion of the line. Another yard, the 120th Yard has been proposed as part of the Red Line extension.

References

External links

 Red Line at CTA official site
 Red Line Extension: Connecting 95th/Dan Ryan Station to 130th Street (CTA official site)

 
Railway lines in Chicago
Railway lines in highway medians
1900 establishments in Illinois
Railway lines opened in 1900